is a Japanese anime series that is a re-imagining of the original Time Bokan series that debuted on October 1, 2016, featuring a team of time travelers in search for the "True History" that is not written in the textbooks. It is a co-production of Tatsunoko Production & Level-5. This series is also legally streamed by Crunchyroll in certain worldwide areas. A second season titled  was announced and it started airing in October 2017. In late 2019, an English dub began airing on the Filipino and  Southeast Asian Cartoon Network channels. The dub made edits such as making Calen's skirt more opaque and modest. The same edits are also applied to the Korean dub.

Plot
Tokio is a junior high student living in the present time who is recruited to be a member of the 24th century's Space-Time Administration Bureau. Together with his partner Calen, their mission is to uncover the "True History", the part of history that the textbooks don't tell. But in their way is the Akudama Trio that intends to prevent the True History from being revealed for their own personal gains.

Cast

Space-Time Administration Bureau

Voiced by: Akihisa Wakayama
The male protagonist and a 14-year-old boy in the 8th grade from the year 2016 who is recruited by the Space-Time Administration Bureau after it is discovered that he is able to withstand the time travel phenomena known as "Time Bokan". He has a habit of breaking the fourth wall when the situations around him seem too weird or incredible.

The female protagonist and a 17-year-old veteran from the Space-Time Administration Bureau who becomes Tokio's partner. Aside from seeking the True History, she also travels around time looking for a lost love of the past.

Tokio and Calen's robot companion. His ability is to summon auxiliary mecha to increase their vehicle, the Mechabutton's power while fighting the Akudama Trio. Pikobo appears in the first season.

Calen's parrot companion. He has the habit of adding "-pera" in the end of its sentences. Peralino appears in the first season.

Voiced by: Kenjiro Tsuda
Is the new robot companion in the second season. O-3 was perverse but possesses emotions humans and it is love in Calen. But it has a secret.

Voiced by: Ryunosuke Watanuki
Is the commander of the Space-Time Administration Bureau (JKK) and orders the missions to Tokio and Calen. Sometimes he is saddened when someone interrupts him. Commander only appears in the first season.

Voiced by: Ryo Sugisaki 
Is the engineer and mechanic of 24 mechas in the JKK. He can be rude, but admire the mechas and prefer to liberate it when they are ready.

Voiced by: Shinsuke Sugawara
Is the engineer in the JKK. He usually does his hobby that is building pyramids with towers or playing cards, but the pyramids fall.

Voiced by: Yūko Minaguchi 
She is the new commander in the second season. Meri is beautiful and sweet, but she has a secret that is hiding an aggressive personality.

History Paradise

The only woman of the Akudama Trio with the habit of bossing around the other two. Whenever they are about to fail, she imagines herself in luxurious fantasies. 

 Voiced by : Hiroaki Hirata
A short, skinny man who is the technician of the Akudama Trio responsible with building the group's mecha. He likes to tweet about almost everything. 

A tall, muscular man who is strong arm of the Akudama Trio.

The owner of History Paradise and the Akudama Trio's employer. His company is the main source of History textbooks in the world in the 24th century and thus he sends the Akudama Trio to thwart Tokio and Calen's efforts to uncover the True History in order to avoid unnecessary revisions.

Episodes

Time Bokan 24 (2016–2017)

In this first season, the OP song was "Fantastic Time" (ep 1–12) and "OVER THE TOP" (ep 13–24) both by Hey! Say! JUMP  and the ED was  "TRUE LOVE" (ep 1–12) by Ai Shinozaki and "Gekiyaba ∞ Bokkaan!!" (ep 13–24) by Moso Calibration.

The Villains' Strike Back (2017–2018)

In the second season, the OP was DESTINY (ep 1–12) by KinKi Kids and "WANTED GIRL" (ep 13–24) by TrySail and the ED was 20xx (ep 1–12) by Yumemiru Adolescence and "Topaz Love" (ep 13–24) by KinKi Kids.

References

External links
 Official Time Bokan 24 anime website 
 Official Time Bokan: The Villains' Strike Back 
 
 

2016 anime television series debuts
2017 anime television series debuts
Time Bokan Series
Yomiuri Telecasting Corporation original programming